The 2022 Malaysia Premier League was the 19th season of the Malaysia Premier League, the second-tier professional football league in Malaysia since its establishment in 2004. This was the last season of Malaysia Premier League as the league discontinued from the following year.

A possible 6 non-feeder teams from this league were planned to be promoted to the upcoming 18-team expansion Malaysia Super League next season. The top 4 non-feeder teams were planned to be promoted automatically to the 2023 Malaysia Super League. The bottom two non-feeder teams will need a play-off against 2022 Malaysia M3 League champions and runners-up to decide the last two spots for promotion to the Super League. However, on 27 September 2022, it was announced by Malaysia Football League that the bottom two non-feeder teams, Perak and UiTM has been promoted automatically to 2023 Super League because the M3 teams that applied for licensing to play in Super League, including champions PIB FC, have failed in their application.

The top 5 non-feeder teams will qualify for the 2022 Malaysia Cup.

Team changes

A total of 10 teams contested the league, including 8 sides from the 2021 season and 2 relegated from the 2021 Malaysia Super League.

To Premier League
Promoted from Liga M3
 No teams.

Relegated from Super League
 Perak
 UiTM

From Premier League
Promoted to Super League
 Negeri Sembilan
 Sarawak United

Relegated to Liga M3
 No teams.

Expulsion
 Perak II

Notes:
 No teams from Malaysia M3 League were promoted due to the 2021 Malaysia M3 League season cancellation. 
 No teams were relegated to Malaysia M3 League as it was decided to keep all the teams from the previous season that were not promoted or expelled. 
 Parent Team and Feeder Team cannot play in the same league, therefore after the relegation of Perak FC from Malaysia Super League last year, Perak FC II must now play in Malaysia M3 League or dissolve. The team later elected to dissolve itself.

Stadium and locations

Note: Table lists in alphabetical order.

Personnel and sponsoring

Note: Flags indicate national team as has been defined under FIFA eligibility rules. Players may hold more than one non-FIFA nationality.

Coaching changes
Note: Flags indicate national team as has been defined under FIFA eligibility rules. Players may hold more than one non-FIFA nationality.

Foreign players
Players name in bold indicates the player was registered after the start of the season.

The number of foreign players is restricted to four each team including at least one player from the AFC country.

Note: Flags indicate national team as has been defined under FIFA eligibility rules. Players may hold more than one non-FIFA nationality.

League table

Result table

Season statistics

Top goalscorers
As of matches played 17 September 2022

Top assists
As of matches played 17 September 2022

Hat-trick
As of matches played 15 August 2022

Notes
(H) – Home team
(A) – Away team

Clean Sheets

See also
 2022 Malaysia Super League
 2022 Malaysia M3 League
 2022 Malaysia M5 League
 2022 Malaysia FA Cup

References

1.https://www.instagram.com/p/CYgELJ7BOfS/

2.https://www.instagram.com/p/CYZIQX1vX5K/

3.https://www.hmetro.com.my/arena/bola-sepak/2021/12/786978/yusri-tinggalkan-skuad-projek-fam-msn

4.https://www.sinarharian.com.my/article/182354/BERITA/Sukan/Empat-lejen-Yoep-ketuai-bahagian-teknikal-Perak-FC

5.https://www.bharian.com.my/sukan/bola/2022/01/910365/syamsul-kendali-kufc

6.https://www.hmetro.com.my/arena/bola-sepak/2022/01/796344/pdrm-sandar-pada-tonggak-muda

External links
 Football Malaysia LLP website

Malaysia
Malaysia Premier League seasons
1